Bukarevac is a village located in the municipality of Preševo, Serbia. According to the 2002 census, the village has a population of 905 people. Of these, 899 (99,33%) were ethnic Albanians, and 6 (0,66 %) others. The name of the settlement Bukarevac originates from the anthroponym Bukor, from the family name Bukorovci.

References

Populated places in Pčinja District
Albanian communities in Serbia